The 2012 Copa Latina was the fourth edition of the annual women's volleyball tournament, organized by the Peruvian Volleyball Federation and Frecuencia Latina, played by four countries from March 31 – April 2, 2012 in Coliseo Eduardo Dibos, Lima, Peru.

Purpose

 participated in the tournament to test a new team for the Olympic Qualification tournament
 participated in the tournament as general preparation for the Olympic Qualification tournament
 participated in the tournament as general preparation for the Olympic Qualification tournament
 participated in the tournament as general preparation for the Olympic Qualification tournament

Round-robin
This edition of the tournament featured only a round-robin system of matches. The team with the most points at the end of the round was declared the winner.

Matches

Final standing

Individual awards

Most Valuable Player

Best Scorer

Best Spiker

Best Blocker

Best Server

Best Digger

Best Setter

Best Receiver

Best Libero

References

Copa Latina
V
Volleyball